Matthew Rea (born 21 September 1993) is an Irish professional rugby union player who plays for Ulster as a back row forward.

He was educated at Ballymena Academy, and helped the school win the 2010 Ulster Schools' Cup final. He represented Ireland at under-19 level in 2011, but was not offered a place in the Ulster Academy when he left school. His performances for Ballymena in the All-Ireland League led to Ulster offering him a development contract ahead of the 2016–17 season. He made his first professional rugby and Ulster appearance in September 2017 against the Cheetahs. He made 18 appearances, including one start, 111 tackles, 6 turnovers, and 24 lineouts won, in 2017–18; nine appearances, and one start, in 2018–19; 19 appearances, and 14 starts, in 2019–20; 14 appearances, and 10 starts in 2020–21; and 10 appearances, including 7 starts, in 2021–22.

His younger brother Marcus, also a back row forward, made his debut for Ulster in 2018.

References

External links
Ulster Rugby profile
United Rugby Championship profile

1993 births
Living people
Irish rugby union players
People educated at Ballymena Academy
Rugby union flankers
Rugby union number eights
Rugby union players from County Down
Ulster Rugby players